For the basketball player, see Kirk Snyder.

Kirk Snyder is an American academic and author. He is a Professor of Business Communication at the USC Marshall School of Business in Los Angeles, California. He has authored three books including Finding Work You Love: 3 Steps to Getting The Perfect Job After College (Ten Speed Press/Penguin Random House, 2020), in addition to two critically acclaimed books on LGBT employees and executives.

Early life
Kirk Snyder graduated from the University of Southern California, where he received a bachelor of science in business administration. He received a master of arts degree in communication from Pepperdine University. He received a doctorate degree in education from the University of Southern California.

Career
Snyder is a Professor of Clinical Business Communication at the USC Marshall School of Business. He is the author of three books on the subject of career development and leadership success.  His work has been widely featured in the media and as a keynote corporate speaker, he has been featured at numerous Fortune 500 companies.

According to The Guardian, he has argued that, "the best managers are gay - because they understand diversity and value individuality, they can bring a team together." Moreover, his research shows that under openly gay managers, employees feel more engaged and they are more productive. Additionally, he has shown that few LGBT executives come out of the closet due to shareholder pressure. He adds that many gay executives eschew corporate discrimination by embracing entrepreneurship, thus becoming their own bosses.

Bibliography
Lavender Road To Success: The Career Guide for the Gay Community (Ten Speed Press, 2003). 
The G Quotient: Why Gay Executives are Excelling as Leaders... And What Every Manager Needs to Know (Jossey-Bass, 2006). 
Finding Work You Love: 3 Steps to Getting The Perfect Job After College (Penguin Random House, 2020).

References

External links
Official website

Living people
Marshall School of Business alumni
Pepperdine University alumni
University of Southern California faculty
LGBT studies academics
American gay writers
American business writers
Year of birth missing (living people)